Vitus is a Latin given name meaning lively and may refer to:

Saint Vitus (c. 290 – c. 303), a Christian martyr
Vitus of Hungary (died 1297), beatified friar
Vitus (bicycles), a French bicycle manufacturer
Vitus (film), a 2006 Swiss film
 Domenico Vitus (born c. 1536), Italian engraver
 Maksim Vitus (born 1989), Belarusian footballer
 Vitus Amerbach (1503–1557), German theologian, scholar and humanist
 Vitus Ashaba (1943–1985), Ugandan middle-distance runner
 Vitus Bering (1681–1741), Danish-born navigator in the service of Russia
 Vitus Bering (1617–1675), Danish poet and historian
 Vitus Eicher (born 1990), German football player
 Vitus Georg Tönnemann (1659–1740), German cleric
 Vitus Graber (1844–1892), Austrian entomologist
 Vitus Huonder (born 1942), Swiss prelate
 Vitus Husek (born 1973), German canoeist
 Vitus Miletus (1549–1615), German theologian
 Vitus Nagorny (born 1978), Kyrgyzstan-born German footballer
 Vitus Pichler (1670–1736), Austrian cleric and writer
 Vitus Piluzzi (died 1704), Italian prelate
 Vitus of Kotor (c. 1275 – after 1335), medieval Serbian architect
 Joseph Vitus Burg (1768–1833), German prelate
 Mba Vitus Onyekachi (born 1984), Nigerian footballer
 Peter Vitus von Quosdanovich (1738–1802), Habsburg nobleman and general
 Weihenstephaner Vitus, a German weizenbock beer
 Vitus baronets, a 17th century English title
 Vitus Lake, a lake in Alaska

See also

Saint Vitus (disambiguation)
Saint Vitus' dance (disambiguation)
 Vitis (disambiguation)
 Vito (given name)
 Veit (given name)
 Vid (given name)